Start Point or Start point may refer to:

Promontories 
 Start Point, Devon, near Dartmouth on the south coast of Devon, England
 Start Point, Cornwall, near Tintagel on the north coast of Cornwall, England
 Start Point, Livingston Island on Livingston Island, Antarctica
 Start Point, Sanday, in the Orkney Islands, Scotland

Other uses 
Start point (yeast), the point in the cell-division cycle of yeast when cells are committed to division
Restriction point, also known as the start point, in cells

See also
 Starting Point (disambiguation)
 Midpoint (disambiguation)
 Endpoint (disambiguation)
 Start (disambiguation)
 Point (disambiguation)